Ali Ramdani, born April 18, 1984, better known by his stage name Lilou, is an Algerian-French b-boy breakdancer. He is part of the French crew Pockemon Crew and the all-star team LEGION X. Since the beginning of his career in 1999 he has won many international prizes, both with his crew and as a solo dancer. He has had a black belt in Kung Fu since he was sixteen. 
He practices Islam and can speak Algerian-Arabic, French and English.

Lilou was the winner of the b-boy competition Red Bull BC One in 2005 and 2009. He is one of the only three competitors to have won the Red Bull BC One twice, the other two being Hong 10 and Menno. He also won Battle of the Year in 2003 with Pockemon Crew. In 2005, Lilou won the Chief Rocka award at the UK Bboy Championships. The following year, he was part of the Pockemon team that won the Crews competition at the UK Bboy Championships. In 2006 Lilou was featured in the game 'B-Boy', released by FreeStyleGames. In 2008 Lilou took part in Chemical Brothers' video Midnight Madness. He also appears in the film StreetDance 2. In 2012 he joined Madonna's MDNA Tour as a dancer and choreographer. In 2014, he became the winner of Undisputed. In doing so, he became the world champion bboy in 2014. He lists Michael Jackson, Zinedine Zidane, Muhammad Ali, and Jamiroquai as influences.

References

External links
Lilou's profile at RedBullBCOne.com
Pockemon crew official website
Lilou Official Website

1984 births
Breakdancers
Living people